Federal Signal Modulators (also known as Modulator Speaker Arrays) are electronic warning devices produced by Federal Signal Corporation that are used to alert the public about tornadoes, severe weather, earthquakes, fires, lahars, tsunamis, or any other disaster. They are identified mostly by their distinctive stacked "flying saucer" design. The Modulator II is sold based on the more compact chassis of the siren compared to the original Modulators.

General description
The modulator is composed of speaker cells (ranging from two to eight, with the exception of seven) that contain four speaker drivers per cell, although two models (model 6032 and 6048) had additional drivers available when they were still produced. Modulators have an inactive (dummy) speaker cell on the bottom of the stack that is used to help project sound in all directions. Due to the design of active cells, there would be unbalanced sound distribution without the inactive cell. Modulators that are being made now use the UltraVoice controller. When they were first made, they were used with Modulator Control Plus and basic/standard Modulator Controls.

Models
Modulator model numbers identify the number of cells, as well as the number of drivers. The first family of modulator arrays consisted of eight different models, as follows: 1004, 2008, 3012, 4016, 5020, 6024, 6032, and 6048.

In January 2013, Federal Signal released the Modulator II sirens, consisting of the 1004B, 2008B, 3012B, 4016B, 5020B, 6024B, and 8032B models. They provide the same alerting technology as the original modulator, with the exception of a smaller compact chassis and cylindrical modules instead of elliptical ones.

Warning tones
Similar to Federal Signal's previous Electronic Outdoor Warning Siren series, the Modulator can produce seven standard warning tones. The seven standard tones are Wail, Alternate Wail, Pulsed Wail, Steady, Alternate Steady, Pulsed Steady and Westminster Chimes. If properly equipped, the Modulator can also employ voice notification to give specific information or to give a more clear understanding of an emergency situation. They have also been known to play Star Spangled Banner during tests on or near the 4th of July, and also on military bases.

The sirens can be activated by radio using single tone, two-tone, DTMF, MSK or POCSAG over analog, digital and trunking systems, or by satellite, cellular, landline or IP. They are also capable of being activated automatically by the Emergency Alert System.

Similar devices
The Modulator has a similar setup to the Whelen WPS 2700, 2800, 2900, and OmniAlert omnidirectional speaker arrays. The Whelen arrays have single driver cells, while Modulators have multi-driver cells. The American Signal I-Force siren, which uses stacked, elliptical speaker cells that provide omnidirectional sound output, is also similar to the Modulator.

Notable locations
The Modulators in Chicago's siren system formerly used to run on the noticeably different and somewhat off-putting Alternate Wail tone during tornado warnings in order to vary from emergency vehicle sirens, often mistaken for being broken, malfunctioning, or hacked. Recordings of the siren have been uploaded to YouTube, with the videos reaching millions of views. Many people refer the Modulator as the "Chicago Siren", "Scary Tornado Siren", "Cthulhu" and "Siren Head" due to the unsettling nature of the tone. However, in O'Hare International Airport, instead of using the main UV Wail or Attack, they use an Eclipse 8 (possibly) sound card doing attack. Before that is the Westminster Chimes. The city of Chicago no longer does its Alternate Wail mode (possibly due to its popularity), and was replaced by Attack mode in the late 2010s.

The city of Moore, Oklahoma is well known for their Modulators being placed closer together in comparison to other cities. They are placed only a half-mile from each other in some parts of the city. Until 2017, some sirens ran on a major third dual-tone alert.

Baytown, Texas is one of only a few cities in the United States to have a whole system of Modulators. The city uses just over twenty 5020s and 5020Bs, primarily for notification of chemical releases. The warning tone is a custom Hi-Lo signal.

The Modulators in Olmsted County, Minnesota are known for their pre-test and post-test voice announcements, and also for only being located in parks.

The Modulators in Monroe County, Michigan are known for their pre-test voice announcements. There is a unique "rainbow" Modulator located in Monroe County as well.

Eden Prairie, Minnesota has a uniquely mounted Modulator 5020 on top of a parking garage which has a custom attack tone that cannot be found on other Modulators. This Modulator has never done a voice announcement, which is one of the primary reasons that some cities invest in them.

Additionally, in Cape Town, South Africa, several Modulator sirens are installed which use their standard wail tone to alert citizens in the Melkbosstrand, Duynefontein, Blaauwberg, Table View, Robben Island, Atlantis, Philadelphia and Parklands areas in case of any emergency which can occur at the Koeberg Nuclear Power Station. These Modulators are tested for about an hour annually on the first Wednesday of March during a so-called "Full Volume Siren Test" using a preset female voice (which reads "This is only a test; there is no need to take any action. This is only a test; there is no need to take any action. I repeat: this is only a test; there is no need to take any action. Listen to Good Hope FM or Kfm for further information") and live voice announcements (which are read by people and are often cite similar things said by the preset voice), other than the typical wail tone of the Modulator.

The Modulators (MOD-2008 & 1004) make up nearly all the warning sirens in the Netherlands, which are tested on the first Monday of the month at noon.

The Modulators in Saudi Arabia are located in Air Force Bases in both Riyadh and Dammam.

The Modulators in Branson, Missouri sometimes use live voice with their Whelen counterparts.

Controllers 
Several controllers were made to run the Modulator sirens. These include the MC (Modulator Controller), MCP (Modulator Power Plus Controller), and UV (UltraVoice). The older SiraTone controller can also run on Modulator sirens but the SiraTone was mainly used on the predecessor EOWS Series sirens. All of the controllers built for the Modulators can be compatible with the Predecessor EOWS sirens, the Successor Modulator II sirens, and the DSA sirens. The Modulator II series started production in 2013 and the older Modulators started production in 1991. The reason why the EOWS sirens can be compatible with these controllers is because the EOWS 408, 812, 115, and 1212 lasted production until 2001. The EOWS 612 was kept in production only on special order until August 3, 2007. All 3 controllers were being made or were made at the time so Federal Signal decided to make the EOWS sirens compatible with these controllers.

MC (Modulator Controller)
The MC Controller came out around 1990 when the Modulator series were being produced. The controller was a microprocessor operated platform which used digital, solid state systems to produce the 7 signals provided by Federal Signal. Unlike the SiraTone, the MC had tones pre-loaded onto an audio ROM chip so there was no need for an analogue tone generator and timer circuit. Audio from the ROM chip was programmed by Federal Signal, with the auxiliary tone being Westminster Chimes by default unless a different tone was requested for by the customer. This could be overwritten by an engineer using software on site, should signaling needs change. The system was activated by two-tone or by DTMF by the controller's internal radio, locally by keying in a two digit code on the controller's keypad, or by operating the controller via landline. When using two-tone or DTMF, the siren has to be "armed" in order to operate (unless programmed not to). To do this a DTMF arm string would first be broadcast to the controller, then a signal DTMF string would be broadcast. Arm period would last for 5 minutes until automatic disarm, unless a "disarm" DTMF string was broadcast before the time expired. This is different, and more secure, to the SiraTone which required a jumper to be added in order to permanently arm the controller. After a signal was activated the digital audio was sent through a digital/analogue converter to each amplifier and onto the speaker array in the form of a square wave. The MC was discontinued in 1996 when it was upgraded to a newer version, the MCP.

MCP (Modulator Power Plus Controller)
The MCP or Modulator Power Plus Controller controller was pretty much the same thing as a MC expect there were a few additions. More signals could be generated through the tone generator, and it could also be activated by Federal Signal's FSK (Frequency Shifting Keys) activation tones. Nothing else changed between the MC and the MCP. The MCP was discontinued around 2002 for the newest version of the series, the UV controller.

UV (UltraVoice)
The UV or UltraVoice Controller is the newest electronic siren controller made by Federal Signal. It now is compatible with the newer type Modulators, the Modulator II series which started production in 2013. The UltraVoice comes in 2 variants: UV and UVIC. The UV is for outdoor use with large speaker arrays like the Modulator, where the UVIC is for indoor use with small speakers and/or intercom systems. UV is capable of holding up to 8 UV400 400 Watt amplifiers, for a total of 3200W. The UV comes standard with 7 signals: Steady, Wail, Alternate Steady, Alternate Wail, Pulsed Steady, Pulsed Wail, and Westminster Chimes. It is offered from the factory in Single or Dual tone, however it is easily changeable after purchase. The frequencies output by the controller are usually 850Hz and 1020 Hz, but there are also customizable, as it has been seen on various Ultra-Voice controlled sirens throughout the USA that the installer set custom pitches.

References

External links

Sound production
Sirens
Disaster preparedness